Bilston is a town in Wolverhampton, in the West Midlands, England. It is close to the borders of Sandwell and Walsall. The nearest towns are Darlaston, Wednesbury, and Willenhall. Historically in Staffordshire, three wards of Wolverhampton City Council now cover the town: Bilston East and Bilston North, which almost entirely comprise parts of the historic Borough of Bilston, and Ettingshall, which comprises a part of Bilston and parts of Wolverhampton.

History
Bilston was first referred to in AD 985 as Bilsatena when Wolverhampton was granted to Wulfrun then in 996 as Bilsetnatun in the grant charter of St. Mary's Church (now St. Peter's Collegiate Church, Wolverhampton). It is later mentioned in the Domesday Book as a village called Billestune, being a largely rural area until the 19th century. Bilsetnatun can be interpreted as meaning the settlement (ton) of the folk (saetan) of the ridge (bill).

Situated two miles southeast of Wolverhampton, it was extensively developed for factories and coal mining. Many houses were constructed in the Bilston area. Between 1920 and 1966, the council replaced most of the 19th-century terraced houses with rented modern houses and flats on developments like Stowlawn, the Lunt, and Bunker's Hill. By 1964 there were more than 6,000 council houses there.

Bilston has had a market in the town centre for many years.

Bilston Urban District Council was formed under the Local Government Act 1894 covering the ancient parish of Bilston. The urban district was granted a Royal Charter in 1933, becoming a municipal borough and Alderman Herbert Beach its Mayor.

In 1966 the Borough of Bilston was abolished, with most of its territory incorporated into the County Borough of Wolverhampton (see History of West Midlands), although parts of Bradley in the east of the town were merged into Walsall borough.

Bilston Town Hall, dating from 1872, has now been refurbished and re-opened. It had been derelict for more than a decade after Wolverhampton Council discontinued its use as housing offices, but now operates as a venue for events, conferences, performances and occasions.

Bilston lost its passenger railway station in 1972, although goods trains continued to pass through the site of the station for a further decade. The town's new bus station opened in October 1991, interlinking with the town's West Midlands Metro station, which opened in May 1999.

The huge British Steel Corporation plant to the west of the town centre was closed in 1979, after 199 years of steel production at the site, with the loss of nearly 2,000 jobs. Part of the site was developed as the Sedgemoor Park Housing Estate between 1986 and 1989, and a B&Q superstore opened on another part of the site in December 1993, forming the first phase of a new small retail park and industrial estate which developed over the next decade. The GKN steel plant to the south of the town centre closed in 1989.

Construction of the long-awaited Black Country Route began in the mid 1980s, with the first section being opened in 1986 and the second section in 1988. By 1992, the third phase of the route was complete, although the final phase was not completed until July 1995, by which time Bilston had a direct unbroken dual carriageway link with Dudley, Walsall and the M5 Motorway. The Black Country Spine Road opened at the same time, improving Bilston's road links with West Bromwich and Birmingham.

21st century developments in Bilston include the South Wolverhampton and Bilston Academy and the adjoining Bert Williams Leisure Centre, which form the centrepiece of the town's new Urban Village, which is planned to include an eventual total of more than 1,000 new homes.

St Leonard's Church

Christian worship in Bilston can be traced back to 1090. In 1458, the chapel was replaced by St Leonard's Chantry and a third renovated church was consecrated in 1733. The church seen today dates from a rebuilding of 1825–26 to the designs of Francis Godwin in the manner of John Soane and is the fourth church on the site, though a small amount of older stonework from the C14 or C15 remains visible inside the present tower. It was altered in 1882–83 by prolific church architect Ewan Christian. Ewan Christian altered the aisle windows into single tall, thin openings where there had previously been two. The church contains a font of 1673, probably from the older church. The church is painted stucco inside and out. It is also unusual in having a chamfered square tower, giving it an octagonal appearance, in being surmounted with a cupola, a golden globe with weather vane and a fenced viewing platform.

Industry

From the middle of the 18th century, Bilston became well known for the craft of enamelling. Items produced included decorative containers such as patch-boxes, scent boxes, and bonbonnieres.

With the opening of the Birmingham Canal to the west of the town in 1770, industrial activity in the local area increased, with the first blast furnaces near the canal at Spring Vale being erected by 1780.

Few towns were more dramatically transformed during the Industrial Revolution as Bilston was. In 1800, it was still a largely rural area dependent on farming. By 1900, it was a busy town with numerous factories and coalmines, as well as a large number of houses that had been built to house the workers and their families. The Bilston coal mines were reputedly haunted by an evil spirit, so the miners brought in a local exorcist known as The White Rabbit.

Six new blast furnaces were erected there between 1866 and 1883. Five of these were producing a total of nearly 25,000 tons of steel per year at what was now known as Bilston Steel Works. The first electric powered blast furnaces opened there in 1907, and finally in 1954 the "Elisabeth" blast furnace was erected, creating 275,000 tons of steel per year. However, by the 1970s the steel works had become uneconomic and the Labour government of James Callaghan decided to close it, with closure taking place on 12 April 1979. The iconic "Elisabeth" was demolished on 5 October 1980. Local unemployment, which had been steadily rising for some years, was pushed even higher by the plant's closure. A former railway bridge which connected parts of the steelworks site remains in situ across the canal.

The industry remained prolific during the interwar years, but much of the housing was now sub-standard, and during the 1920s and 1930s, many of the older houses were cleared and replaced by new council houses that featured so many modern conveniences that were previously unknown to their occupants.

People
John Wilkinson, "king of the ironmasters", built a blast furnace in Bilston in 1748. He lived and died in Bradley, Staffordshire. His body was returned to his hometown of Clifton in Cumberland.
Richard Salter began making the first spring scales in Britain in Bilston in the late 1760s.
Bilston was the birthplace of the poet Sir Henry Newbolt, his brother barrister, judge and artist Sir Francis Newbolt and Nelson, New Zealand Mayor George Page.
Captain George Onions VC, British soldier born in Bilston and awarded the Victoria Cross in August 1918.
Hugh Walters, science fiction writer, lived all his life (1910–1993) in Bilston.
Bert (The Cat) Williams MBE, goalkeeper in the 1940s and 1950s with Wolverhampton Wanderers (420 appearances) and also with the England squad (31 caps). Born in Bradley, Bilston in 1920 he died in Shifnal in 2014. He has a sports centre in his name in the town.
David Daker, born in Bilston in 1935, is a British actor. His best-known roles are in television. He played PC Owen Culshaw in Z-Cars, Jarvis in Porridge, Captain Nathan Spiker in Dick Turpin and Harry Crawford in Boon.
Sir Bruce Forsyth made his first public stage appearance, billed as "Boy Bruce, the Mighty Atom", aged 14 at the Theatre Royal in 1942.
Reg Lewis who scored both goals for Arsenal in their 2–0 victory over Liverpool in the 1950 FA Cup final was born in Bilston.
James Fleet (born 1952) is a British actor. He is most famous for his roles as the bumbling and well-meaning Tom in the 1994 British romantic comedy film Four Weddings and a Funeral, and the dim-witted Hugo Horton in the BBC situation comedy television series The Vicar of Dibley.
Don Powell, drummer in the band Slade, was born in Bilston.
Steve Woolam, Born in Bilston in 1946 and died in 1971 was one of the founder members of the Electric Light Orchestra.

Transport
The original line of the Birmingham Canal (now the BCN Old Main Line) was specifically planned to serve Bilston amongst other towns. The bill for its construction stated that "the Primary and Principal Object of this Undertaking was and is to obtain a Navigation from the Collieries to this Town [ie Birmingham]".  The canal opened from Wednesbury to Birmingham on 6 November 1769 and through to Newell on 25 March 1772.  Coal from Bilston was reaching Birmingham by May 1770.  When the BCN New Main Line was built the Wednesbury section became a loop serving industry and collieries, the southern part of which was subsequently abandoned and filled in.  A branch was also built from the Walsall Canal to Bilston, but was closed in 1953.

From 1850 to 1972 there was a railway station in Bilston town centre, but passenger services were then withdrawn and the line via Bilston (from Wolverhampton Low Level to Birmingham Snow Hill) had been almost completely abandoned within a decade. The final stub of the railway, connecting a town centre scrapyard with the South Staffordshire Line at Wednesbury, closed in 1992, only to be re-opened seven years later as the first phase of the West Midlands Metro tram line between Wolverhampton and Birmingham.

The West Midlands Metro serves Bilston with 3 stops, Bilston Central in the Centre, Loxdale & The Crescent. The town is set to be served by 2 new lines by 2024, with trams travelling to Stourbridge & Walsall.

There was also a further railway station within the town: Bilston West on the Oxford-Worcester-Wolverhampton Line. Due to building encroachment on the track bed, it's impossible to reopen this line.

Another significant development in the Bilston area was the A463 Black Country Route. With more and more cars on the road, the roads around Bilston town centre became increasingly congested as the 20th century progressed. It became so severe that, by the late 1960s, the government had drawn up plans for a new motorway bypassing Bilston (and running from the A4123 near Coseley to Junction 10 of the M6 motorway at Walsall), which was scheduled to be completed by 1976. However, the plans collapsed and Bilston was condemned to increased congestion, for another decade at least. The plans for a new dual carriageway were revived in the early 1980s. This time the planners had decided on a slightly different route, which would run much closer to Bilston town centre. The first phase of the road (to be known as Black County Route) was completed in 1986, though initially running around half a mile east of the A4123. It was extended in 1990 to Oxford Street in Bilston town centre. This expansion resulted in a number of buildings being demolished and some roads having to be re-routed while one road (Market Street) was obliterated. This new road changed the face of Bilston town centre forever. During 1995, the final phase of the Black Country Route between Bilston town centre and Junction 10 of the M6 was completed. This new road has seen a major improvement in the traffic flow around Bilston town centre.

Bilston is served by several bus routes at Bilston bus station. It is also served by National Express West Midlands service 79 (West Bromwich – Wednesbury – Darlaston – Bilston – Wolverhampton).

Arts and culture

At the Bilston end of the Black Country Route can be seen the group of wooden statues designed by Robert Koenig and called "Steel Columns." "This sculpture was made from 15 lengths of sweet chestnut which stretch up to 6 metres in height. The male and female figures depicted are based on those found in old Victorian photographs of Bilston. The title Steel Columns is a reference to Bilston's steel making background and the connection the figures had with this history."

Art and craft works of local significance from the eighteenth century are displayed at Bilston Craft Gallery, which also has a temporary exhibition space where local art and crafts are often displayed. The craft gallery also hosts workshops for children and families and where some school trips take place.

The artist William Harold Dudley as born in Bilston; several of his works are in the collection of Wolverhampton Art Gallery.

Bilston Carnival in the 60's travelled along Wellington Road before ending in Hickman Park where there would be Pat Collins' fun fair, horse jumping and an open air stage hosting various entertainment including wrestling and live music bands. The park also had one of the tallest slides for children in any park.

Education
Bilston has 15 primary schools, and two secondary schools – South Wolverhampton and Bilston Academy and Moseley Park School, which was originally Etheridge Secondary Modern (formerly Fraser Street Schools), and Bilston Boys' Grammar School. Manor Primary School, which used to be a secondary school, is sometimes incorrectly believed to be in Bilston, but is actually in Woodcross which is within the Wolverhampton-governed part of Coseley. In 1962 Green Acres Junior school had teachers which included Mr and Mrs. Webb and Mr. Elwell who introduced classical music and elocution lessons to soften Wolverhampton accents. About 8 students went on to Grammar Schools in 1963 including Mr. and Mrs. Webb's twins – Christopher and Nicholas; top student Timothy Calloway; and the first coloured student, Pravin Patel, who went on to Bilston Grammar School to be the first coloured student there as well.

Bilston had a Cholera Orphan School which was opened on 3 August 1833 following a severe outbreak during the second cholera pandemic (1829–51) which had left 450 orphans in Bilston after the death of 742 sufferers. The Royal School, Wolverhampton has similar origins.

Crime
In 1862, Bilston was scandalised by the case of David Brandrick, the "Bilston Murderer". The story was heavily covered by all the local papers, but according to a report in the Windsor and Eton Journal, Saturday 11 January 1862, Brandrick was hanged outside Stafford Jail that morning for the murder of John Bagott, a clothier and pawnbroker.

On 30 September 2007, the body of 16-year-old Shane Owoo was recovered from a flooded clay pit near the Lunt estate. Two Wolverhampton men, Christopher Lewis and Marvin Walker, were found guilty of manslaughter on 25 April 2008 and sentenced to five and a half years in prison. The jury at Birmingham Crown Court heard that the pair had frogmarched Shane Owoo to the pool amid allegations that he had stolen a bicycle from one of the defendants. A third man, Tobias Davies, received a 12-month prison sentence for assaulting Shane Awoo, but had not been present when the other two men attacked him and chased him into the pool where he drowned.

On 28 July 2009, 47-year-old Moxley pub landlord Swinder Singh Batth was shot dead in the town centre outside Gavin's Sports Bar. Jasbir Singh Takhar, of Coseley, and Sukwinder Singh Sanghera, of West Bromwich, were jailed for life a year later for the murder; it was established that they had been attempting to shoot someone else. The trial judge recommended minimum terms of 29 and 28 years respectively. Five other people received prison sentences of between 21 months and three years for conspiracy to commit violent disorder in connection with the crime, while a sixth person received a three-and-half-year prison sentence for witness intimidation.

On 21 November 2009, 50-year-old Dudley man Daniel McCalla was shot dead at the town's Tropical Harmony nightclub.

Bilston's districts
Bradley
Woodcross
The Lunt
Stowlawn

Parliament

The town had its own parliamentary constituency from 1918 until 1974, which also included nearby Sedgley and Coseley. However, it was then incorporated into Wolverhampton South East, where it has remained since, and under further boundary reorganisation it could be divided into up to four parliamentary seats, with the bulk of the town being divided between two reorganised Wolverhampton seats but smaller parts of the town being absorbed into Dudley and Walsall constituencies. However these plans have been shelved for the time being.

References

External links

Stories, Crime, and Old Photographs.
Pictures from Bilston and its history
Pictures of interior and exterior of St Leonard's church, 2002
Black Country Society 
Black Country Living Museum, which has buildings and object collections relating to Bilston

Areas of Wolverhampton
Towns in the West Midlands (county)